Stade Auguste Vollaire is a multi-use stadium in Centre de Flacq, Flacq District, Mauritius.  It is currently used mostly for football matches and is the home stadium of Faucon Flacq SC.  The stadium holds 4,000 people.

History 
For first time the Final of the 2019 Indian Ocean Island Games will play there. It will oppose the host country  Mauritius against reunion.

External links
Stadiums in Mauritius

References

Football venues in Mauritius